The Holcim Awards is an international competition that seeks projects and visionary concepts in sustainable construction – irrespective of scale. A total of USD $1 million in prize money is awarded in each two-year cycle. 
Eligible for entry are projects in: buildings and civil engineering works; landscape, urban design and infrastructure; and materials, products and construction technologies. The Holcim Awards is conducted by the Holcim Foundation for Sustainable Construction based in Zurich, Switzerland. Entries can only be made online.

The competition was known as the Holcim Awards from 2003. Holcim Ltd and Lafarge S.A. completed their global merger and launched LafargeHolcim in July 2015. The name of the foundation was changed to LafargeHolcim Foundation, and the competition became the LafargeHolcim Awards. Once the group dropped Lafarge from its name, the Foundation also adopted the new naming.

A global phase through five regional competition

The Holcim Awards is a global competition awarded across five geographic areas: North America, Latin America, Middle East Africa, Asia Pacific, and Europe. Entries in the competition are allocated to a region based on the location of the project.

Holcim Awards main category

Since 2023, there is only one category within the competition: The Holcim Awards main category of the competition is open to architects, planners, engineers, and project owners that showcase sustainable responses to technological, environmental, socioeconomic and cultural issues affective contemporary building and construction. Fifteen projects receive Holcim Awards Gold, Silver, or Bronze awards in the five regions. Until the 6th cycle, the Next Generation category was open for students and young professionals not older than 30. The category was seeking visionary design concepts and bold ideas including design studio and research work.

Evaluation criteria
Submissions in both categories are evaluated by independent juries, using the Foundation's "four goals" to define sustainable construction:

 Uplifting Places. Beautiful and spatially relevant structures that work in unison with the local context and culture
 Healthy Planet. Structures that minimize resource use, avoid emissions, and embed solutions to repair ecosystems and restore biodiversity
 Viable Economics. Financial planning that combines short term project feasibility with long term value creation
 Thriving Communities. Inclusive and affordable living environments that cultivate equity, health and well-being

Juries

The independent juries consist of renowned experts from architecture, engineering, planning, and the construction industry.

Prizes

The total prize money for each cycle of the Holcim Awards competition is US$1 million.

Global Awards winning projects
Source:

References

Sources

External links
 Holcim Awards Official Website
 Holcim Foundation Official Website

Architecture awards
International sustainability organizations
Non-profit organisations based in Switzerland
Foundations based in Switzerland
Holcim Group